Mikaël Caradec (born 29 April 1982) is a French professional footballer who currently plays as a goalkeeper for Cholet.

External links
Mickaël Caradec profile at foot-national.com

1982 births
Living people
Sportspeople from Saint-Nazaire
French footballers
Association football goalkeepers
Vendée Fontenay Foot players
Lannion FC players
Vendée Poiré-sur-Vie Football players
Aviron Bayonnais FC players
LB Châteauroux players
Ligue 2 players
Championnat National players
Footballers from Loire-Atlantique
Brittany international footballers